Phtheochroa waracana is a species of moth of the family Tortricidae. It is found in North America, where it has been recorded from Alberta, Arizona, California, Indiana, Maine, Manitoba, Ontario and Saskatchewan.

The wingspan is about 20 mm. Adults have been recorded on wing from June to August.

References

Moths described in 1907
Phtheochroa